Arthur Harrison Allard Vann (1 May 1884 – 25 September 1915) was a British Army officer killed in the First World War. He had been a professional football outside left who appeared in the Football League for Burton United.

Personal life 
Vann was born on 1 May 1884 in Bugbrooke, Northamptonshire. His parents, Alfred George Collins Vann and Hannah Elizabeth Vann were teachers and his younger brother was Bernard William Vann. He attended Chichele College, Higham Ferrers, where his father was headmaster.

Vann was commissioned as a second lieutenant in the 5th Battalion, The King's Own (Yorkshire Light Infantry) on 29 June 1908. This was a Territorial Force unit. He resigned his commission in August 1911.

Both Vann and his brother Bernard attended Jesus College, Cambridge. Bernard matriculated in 1907 and Arthur in 1909, aged 25. He graduated in 1913.

In the First World War, Vann was again commissioned in the Army as a temporary lieutenant on 1 October 1914. He served in the 28th (County of London) Battalion of The London Regiment, (The Artists' Rifles) and the West Yorkshire Regiment during the first year of the war. He held the rank of captain and was adjutant of the 12th Battalion of the West Yorkshire Regiment when he was killed at the Battle of Loos on 25 September 1915. His body was not recovered and he is commemorated on the Loos Memorial.

Bernard Vann also served, winning a VC and an MC and Bar, before being killed in action in France on 3 October 1918.

References 

1884 births
Artists' Rifles officers
Military personnel from Northamptonshire
Sportspeople from Northamptonshire
English footballers
Northampton Town F.C. players
Association football outside forwards
English Football League players
British Army personnel of World War I
Burton United F.C. players
British military personnel killed in World War I
1915 deaths
West Yorkshire Regiment officers
Southern Football League players
Alumni of Jesus College, Cambridge
People from Bugbrooke
King's Own Yorkshire Light Infantry officers